Alpenus pardalina is a moth of the family Erebidae. It was described by Walter Rothschild in 1910. It is found in Tanzania and Kenya.

The larvae feed on Zea mays (corn).

References

Moths described in 1910
Spilosomina
Moths of Africa
Insects of Tanzania
Insects of Uganda